Montanejos is a municipality of Spain located in the province of Castellón, Valencian Community. It belongs to the comarca of Alto Mijares. The municipality spans across a total area of 37.80 km2 and, as of 1 January 2020, it has a registered population of 564.

References 

Municipalities in the Province of Castellón
Alto Mijares